The Gauliga Elsaß was the highest football league in the region of Alsace (German: Elsaß, the old orthography of Elsass) from 1940 to 1945. The Nazis reorganised the administrative region and the Alsace became part of the Gau Baden-Elsaß.

Overview
The league was introduced by the Nazi Sports Office in 1940, after the French defeat and the direct German administration of the Alsace region. The Alsace region was traditionally disputed between the two countries and had been part of the German Empire from 1871 to 1918, with its football clubs playing in the German league system then.

The de facto annexation of Alsace in June 1940 meant the return of competitive football to the region, as league competition had already been suspended in France in September 1939 but continued in Germany. The Gauliga Elsaß was established with sixteen clubs in two groups of eight, all from the Alsace region. The two group winners then played a home-and-away final to determine the Alsace champion and the team entering the German championship.

The league was reduced to one single group of twelve teams in the 1941–42 season with the bottom four teams relegated. The season after, it operated with ten clubs and two relegated teams. This modus remained in place for the 1943–44 season.

In late 1944, the Alsace region became part of the frontline and it was doubtful whether the 1944–45 season was even able to get underway. The league was scheduled to have two groups, a northern one with five and a southern one with six clubs.

After the region had been completely liberated by allied forces, Strasbourg being retaken on 22 November 1944, the Alsace and its football clubs returned to France with the top club, the RC Strasbourg, reentering the French first division in 1945.

Founding members of the league
The sixteen founding members in 1940 were split into two groups. All clubs came from the French league system and are still active as of 2008, unless stated otherwise:
 Group 1:
 Rasen SC Straßburg, finished 10th in 1938–39 French Division 1 as RC Strasbourg, reverted to their original name in 1940
 SC Schiltigheim, was Sporting Club Schiltigheim, reverted to their original name in 1940  
 SG SS Straßburg, was SC Red-Star Strasbourg, reverted to their original name in 1940 
 FC Hagenau, was FC Haguenau, reverted to their original name in 1940 
 FK Mars Bischheim, was CS Mars 1905 Bischheim, reverted to their original  name in 1940 
 SV 06 Schlettstadt, was SC Sélestat, reverted to their original name in 1940 
 SV Straßburg, was Association Sportive de Strasbourg, reverted to their original name in 1940 
 FC Bischweiler, FC Bischwiller, reverted to their original name in 1940 
 Group 2:  
 FC Mülhausen 93, finished 7th in 1938–39 French Division 2 as FC de Mulhouse, reverted to their original name in 1940 
 SpVgg Kolmar, finished 5th in 1938–39 French Division 2 as SR Colmar, reverted to their original name in 1940 
 FC Wittenheim, Union Sportive Wittenheim, reverted to their old name in 1940 
 FC Kolmar, FC Colmar, reverted to their old name in 1940, renamed FC Colmar in 1945, and Stade de Colmar 77 in 1977 ; club disbanded in June 1986
 ASV Mülhausen, was Cercle Athlétique Mulhousien, reverted to their original name in 1940, renamed Association Sportive Mulhousienne in 1945 
 SpVgg Dornach, was FC Dornach, reverted to their old name in 1940 
 SV Wittelsheim, was Association Sportive des Colonies Amélie Wittelsheim, reverted to their original name in 1940 
 FC St. Ludwig, was FC Saint-Louis, reverted to their old name in 1940, renamed FC Saint-Louis in 1945, merged with FC Neuweg in 1990
 All clubs had to either Germanise their name or, if formed before 1918, revert to their original German name.

Winners and runners-up of the league
The winners and runners-up of the league:

Placings in the league 1940-44
The complete list of clubs competing in the league:

References

Sources
 Die deutschen Gauligen 1933-45 - Heft 1-3  Tables of the Gauligas 1933-45, publisher: DSFS
 Kicker Almanach,  The yearbook on German football from Bundesliga to Oberliga, since 1937, published by the Kicker Sports Magazine
 Collectif, 100 ans de football en Alsace  (5 vol.), Strasbourg, LAFA, 2002,

External links
  The Gauligas Das Deutsche Fussball Archiv 
 Germany - Championships 1902-1945 at RSSSF.com
 Where's My Country? - French clubs in the German football structure 1940-1944 Article on cross-border movements of football clubs, at RSSSF.com

Sports leagues established in 1940
1940 establishments in Germany
1944 disestablishments in Germany
Gauliga
Football competitions in Alsace-Lorraine
Football leagues in France
1940–41 in French football
1941–42 in French football
1942–43 in French football
1943–44 in French football